Mikhail Levit (born April 13, 1944) is a Soviet-born Israeli photographer and pictorialist.

Biography
Mikhail was born in 1944 during the World War II. At that time, his family was in evacuation in Uzbek Samarkand. Soon the family moved to Cherkasy, where Mikhail Levit lived the next 50 years of his life.

He studied at the Cherkasy Pedagogical Institute. Photographing carried away while serving in the Soviet Army. He started his way as a journalist photographer and in a very short time was recognized as a professional.

Participant with numerous exhibitions, from Singapore, to a solo exhibition in the United States. There were many exhibitions in Europe.

In the 1990s, he was hired to work in Israel, where his eldest daughter already lived. After a series of successful exhibitions remained on a permanent residence. Lives in Ma'ale Adummim.

A most famous Mikhail Levit's series of photographs  This is Me, God, this is Me... is dedicated to people praying at the Western Wall of Jerusalem.

References

External links 
 Photo Studio Mikhail Levit –  Photography At Its Best
 Mikhail Levit at the photographer.ru

1944 births
Living people
People from Samarkand
Soviet photographers
Israeli photographers
Ukrainian photographers
Soviet Jews
Ukrainian Jews
Ukrainian emigrants to Israel
Pictorialists
Street photographers